Microtomus luctuosus is a species of assassin bug in the family Reduviidae. It is found in Central America Soulth America and North America.

References

Further reading

 

Reduviidae
Articles created by Qbugbot
Insects described in 1854